Events from the year 1868 in Canada.

Incumbents

Crown 
 Monarch – Victoria

Federal government 
 Governor General – Charles Monck, 4th Viscount Monck  
 Prime Minister – John A. Macdonald
 Parliament – 1st

Provincial governments

Lieutenant governors 
Lieutenant Governor of New Brunswick – Francis Pym Harding (until July 23) then Lemuel Allan Wilmot 
Lieutenant Governor of Nova Scotia – Charles Hastings Doyle
Lieutenant Governor of Ontario – Henry William Stisted (until July 15) then William Pearce Howland
Lieutenant Governor of Quebec – Narcisse-Fortunat Belleau

Premiers 
Premier of New Brunswick – Andrew Rainsford Wetmore
Premier of Nova Scotia – William Annand 
Premier of Ontario – John Sandfield Macdonald
Premier of Quebec – Pierre-Joseph-Olivier Chauveau

Colonies 
Secretary of State for the Colonies – The Duke of Buckingham and Chandos then The Earl Granville

Governors 
Colonial Governor of Newfoundland – Anthony Musgrave
Lieutenant Governor of Prince Edward Island – George Dundas (until October 22) then Robert Hodgson
Governor of the United Colonies of Vancouver Island and British Columbia – Frederick Seymour

Premiers 
Colonial Prime Minister of Newfoundland – Frederick Carter
Premier of Colony of Prince Edward Island – George Coles

Events
March 4 — Royal College of Dental Surgeons of Ontario established
April 7 — Father of Confederation Thomas D'Arcy McGee is assassinated in Ottawa by Irish Fenians.
May 26 - The Canadian flag is unofficially introduced.

Full date unknown
Louis Riel returns to the Red River area
The Hudson's Bay Company agrees to turn Rupert's Land and the North-Western Territory over to Canada
The first Federal Militia Act is passed, creating a Canadian army
George-Étienne Cartier created a Baronet

Births

January to June
January 16 — Octavia Ritchie, first woman to receive a medical degree in Quebec
January 22 — Adjutor Rivard, lawyer, writer, judge and linguist (died 1945)
February 16 — John Babington Macaulay Baxter, lawyer, jurist and 18th Premier of New Brunswick (died 1946)
March 14 — Emily Murphy, women's rights activist, jurist and author, first woman magistrate in Canada and in the British Empire (died 1933)
April 27 — James Kidd Flemming, businessman, politician and 13th Premier of New Brunswick (died 1927)
May 31 — Victor Cavendish, 9th Duke of Devonshire, politician and 11th Governor General of Canada (died 1938)

July to December
July 8 — Henry Cockshutt, Lieutenant Governor of Ontario (died 1944)
July 9 — William Alves Boys, politician and barrister (died 1938)
August 25 — Arthur Puttee, politician (died 1957)
August 26 — Charles Stewart, politician and 3rd Premier of Alberta (died 1946)
September 1 — Henri Bourassa, politician and publisher (died 1952)
September 22 — Louise McKinney, first woman sworn into the Legislative Assembly of Alberta and first woman elected to a legislature in Canada and in the British Empire (died 1931)
September 28 — Herbert Alexander Bruce, surgeon and 15th Lieutenant Governor of Ontario (died 1963)
November 9 — Marie Dressler, actress (died 1934)
December 11 — William Parks, geologist and paleontologist (died 1936)

Deaths

January 19 — Frederic, Roman Catholic priest, missionary, and bishop (born 1797)
January 25 — Alexander Roberts Dunn, first Canadian awarded the Victoria Cross (born 18)
January 28 — Edmund Walker Head, Governor (born 1805)
February 19 — Dominick Daly, politician (born 1798)
April 7 — D'Arcy McGee, journalist, politician and Father of Confederation, assassinated (born 1825)
August 7 — William Agar Adamson, Church of England clergyman and author (born 1800)
September 12 — Charles Dickson Archibald, lawyer, businessman and politician (born 1802)
October 17 — Laura Secord, heroine of the War of 1812 (born 1775)

Historical documents
Political cartoon satirizes Nova Scotians' mixed feelings about Confederation

Indigenous people assert claim to their reserve at Lake of Two Mountains (Oka), Quebec

"The moment was fraught with danger" - British spy addresses large rally of Fenians

Report by a visitor to newly opened settler lands in Muskoka, Ontario

In his last Commons speech, D'Arcy McGee lauds anyone "prepared[...]to sacrifice himself [for] principles[...]adopted as those of truth"

Federal deputy minister of agriculture says connoisseur in France finds Canadian wine to be vin d'ordinaire second only to their own

References
  

 
Canada
Years of the 19th century in Canada
1868 in North America